For the 1962 Vuelta a España, the field consisted of 90 riders; 48 finished the race.

By rider

By nationality

References

1962 Vuelta a España
1962